Foy is a hamlet and parish in Herefordshire, England. The hamlet lies in a loop of the River Wye with the nearest vehicle bridges at Ross and Hoarwithy.

History
Early archeological finds. In 1791 a hoard of what was then described as "Bronze age celts" was found on rising ground between Hole-in-the-Wall and Old Gore. The word "celts" is obsolete now but probably refers in this instance to axes made of bronze, thereby establishing occupation of Foy in the Bronze Age.

In Anglo-Saxon times, Foy was part of Mercia and records from 866 AD mention the establishment of a monastery at Foy (Lann Timoi).

Saint Mary's church
The present church is dedicated to Saint Mary.  The south porch dates from the early 14th-century and the tower is in the Decorated style.

The parish
The civil parish of Foy includes Hole-in-the-Wall, and Old Gore and had a population in mid-2010 of 158.

Hole-in-the-Wall
Hole-in-the-Wall on the east bank of the River Wye is accessible by a footbridge, built in 1919 by David Rowell & Co. It featured in the British television series Survivors, in an episode titled "Gone Away" (1975).

Long-distance footpaths
The Herefordshire Trail and Wye Valley Walk long-distance footpaths pass through Hole-in-the-Wall.

Notable people
 Peter Mandelson was introduced to the House of Lords as Baron Mandelson of Foy in the county of Herefordshire and Hartlepool in the county of Durham.  He owned a cottage in the village in the mid 1980s.

 Lt. Col. Trevor L. Sharpe, Director of Music in the British Army, is buried in the churchyard. He was a judge on the BBC series The Best of Brass and conducted the theme music for the closing credits of Dad's Army.

Sources
 Ancient Dean and the Wye Valley by Bryan Walters

References

Hamlets in Herefordshire
Civil parishes in Herefordshire